Good Morning Susie Soho is a studio album by Swedish group Esbjörn Svensson Trio that was released in September 2000 by Sony BMG. The album peaked at No. 15 on the Swedish Sverigetopplistan album chart. All tracks were written by the trio except "The Face of Love", which was written by Nusrat Fateh Ali Khan, David Robbins, and Tim Robbins.

Reception
Good Morning Susie Soho received critical acclaim. Stuart Nicholson of JazzTimes described the album as "darkly lyrical [and] fiercely contemporary". It was named "Album of the Year" for 2000 by Jazzwise magazine.

Track listing
"Somewhere Else Before" – 5:35
"Do the Jangle" – 5:58
"Serenity" – 1:50
"The Wraith" – 9:20
"Last Letter from Lithuania" – 4:10
"Good Morning Susie Soho" – 5:51
"Providence" – 4:53
"Pavane (Thoughts of a Septuagenarian)" – 3:43
"Spam-Boo-Limbo" – 4:39
"The Face of Love" – 6:51
"Reminiscence of a Soul" – 11:59

Personnel
Esbjörn Svensson – keyboards
Dan Berglund – bass guitar, double bass
Magnus Öström – drums, gopichard, percussion, tabla
Johan Ekelund – mastering
Janne Hansson – technician
Jonas "Joker" Berggren – photography
Jonas Asp – piano technician
Esbjörn Svensson Trio – arrangements, composition, production

References

2000 albums
Esbjörn Svensson Trio albums
ACT Music albums